Shilpi Neha Tirkey is an Indian politician who is serving as a Member of Jharkhand Legislative Assembly from Mandar since June 2022 representing the Indian National Congress. She is daughter of Bandhu Tirkey.

References 

Jharkhand politicians
Jharkhand MLAs 2019–2024
Living people
Year of birth missing (living people)